Cineni may refer to:
The village of Cineni in Gwoza, Borno State, Nigeria.
The Cineni language